David Prinosil and David Rikl were the defending champions but only Prinosil competed that year with Yevgeny Kafelnikov.

Kafelnikov and Prinosil lost in the first round to Younes El Aynaoui and Ivan Ljubičić.

Jonas Björkman and Todd Woodbridge won in the final 6–3, 6–4 against Martin Damm and Cyril Suk.

Seeds
Champion seeds are indicated in bold text while text in italics indicates the round in which those seeds were eliminated.

  Jonas Björkman /  Todd Woodbridge (champions)
  Martin Damm /  Cyril Suk (final)
  Donald Johnson /  Leander Paes (first round)
  Yevgeny Kafelnikov /  David Prinosil (first round)

Draw

External links
 2003 Gerry Weber Open Doubles Draw

2003 Gerry Weber Open